A Peter Pan disk is a circumstellar disk around a star or brown dwarf that appears to have retained enough gas to form a gas giant planet for much longer than the typically assumed gas dispersal timescale of approximately 5 million years. Several examples of such disks have been observed to orbit stars with spectral types of M or later. The presence of gas around these disks has generally been inferred from the total amount of radiation emitted from the disk at infrared wavelengths, and/or spectroscopic signatures of hydrogen accreting onto the star.

In 2016 volunteers of the Disk Detective project discovered WISE J080822.18-644357.3 (or J0808). This low-mass star showed signs of youth, for example a strong infrared excess and active accretion of gaseous material. It is part of the 45 Myr old Carina young moving group, older than expected for these characteristics of an M-dwarf. Other stars and brown dwarfs were discovered to be similar to J0808, with signs of youth while being in an older moving group. Together with J0808, these older low-mass accretors in nearby moving groups have been called Peter Pan disks in one scientific paper published in early 2020. Since then the term was used by other independent research groups.

Name 
Peter Pan disks are named after the main character Peter Pan in the play and book Peter Pan, or The Boy Who Wouldn’t Grow Up, written by J.M. Barrie in 1904. The Peter Pan disks have a young appearance, while being old in years. In other words: The Peter Pan disks "refuse to grow up", a feature they share with the lost boys and titular character in Peter Pan.

Characteristics 
The known Peter Pan disks have the H-alpha spectroscopic line as a sign of accretion. J0808 shows variations in the Paschen-β and Brackett-γ lines, which is a clear sign of accretion. It was also identified as lithium-rich, which is a sign of youth.

J0808 shows variations in the light curve from CTIO, which could be disk material blocking light from the star. The source also showed a strong flare. It shows three distinct disk components: A "hot" inner disk with a temperature of 1100 K (827 °C or 1520 °F), located at  0.0056 au. A "warm" outer disk with a temperature of 240 K (-33 °C or -28 °F), located at 0.115 au. A "cold" outer disk with a temperature of 20 K (-253 °C or -424 °F), located at <16 au.

2MASS J05010082-4337102 showed a flare in a TESS light curve and periodic variations, which could be due to starspots. The system is inclined to our line of sight by ~38°, enough to not expect any disk material to move in front of the star.

WISEA J044634.16-262756.1 and WISEA J094900.65-713803.1 are both apparent visual double in Gaia data.

2MASS J02265658-5327032 is a candidate brown dwarf with a Peter Pan disk.

Known Peter Pan disks 

The prototype Peter Pan disk is WISE J080822.18-644357.3. It was discovered by the NASA-led citizen science project Disk Detective.

Murphy et al. found additional Peter Pan disks in the literature, which were identified as part of the Columba and Tucana-Horologium associations. Examples are 2MASS J0041353-562112 in Tuc-Hor, 2MASS J05010082-4337102 in Columba and 2MASS J02265658-5327032 in Tuc-Hor. The Tuc-Hor association has an age of 45±4 Myr and the Columba association has an age of 42 Myr. 2MASS J0041353-562112 was later discarded as it does not show excess and could belong to the Beta Pictoris moving group.

The Disk Detective Collaboration identified two additional Peter Pan disks: WISEAJ044634.16-262756.1 in Columba and WISEA J094900.65-713803.1 in Carina. Both systems are visual doubles. The paper also mentions that members of NGC 2547 were previously identified to have 22 μm excess and could be similar to Peter Pan disks.  2MASS 08093547-4913033, which is one of the M-dwarfs with a debris disk in NGC 2547 was observed with the Spitzer Infrared Spectrograph. In this system the first detection of silicate was made from a debris disk around an M-type star. While the system shows the H-alpha line, it was interpreted to be devoid of gas and nonaccreting.

Implications for planet formation around M-stars 
There are different models to explain the existence of Peter Pan disks, such as disrupted planetesimals or recent collisions of planetary bodies. One explanation is that Peter Pan disks are long-lived primordial disks. This would follow the trend of lower-mass stars requiring more time to dissipate their disks. Exoplanets around M-stars would have more time to form, significantly affecting the atmospheres on these planets.

See also

 WISE J080822.18-644357.3
 Disk Detective
 Circumstellar disk
 Protoplanetary disk
 Debris disk
 T Tauri star
 HD 74389
 AU Microscopii

References

External links 

 AWI0005x3s talk page at diskdetective.org
 NASA Citizen Scientists Discover “Peter Pan Disks”

Circumstellar disks